Hyper Search is a method of link analysis for search engines. It was created by Italian researcher Massimo Marchiori.

Bibliography

 Massimo Marchiori, "The Quest for Correct Information on the Web: Hyper Search Engines", Proceedings of the Sixth International World Wide Web Conference (WWW6), 1997.
 Sergey Brin and Lawrence Page, "The anatomy of a large-scale hypertextual Web search engine", Proceedings of the Seventh International World Wide Web Conference (WWW7), 1998.

See also 
 PageRank
 Spamdexing
 PR

References 

Internet search